Dernell Every (August 18, 1906 – September 11, 1994) was an American fencer. He won a bronze medal in the team foil event at the 1932 Summer Olympics.

References

External links
 

1906 births
1994 deaths
American male foil fencers
Fencers at the 1928 Summer Olympics
Fencers at the 1932 Summer Olympics
Fencers at the 1948 Summer Olympics
Olympic bronze medalists for the United States in fencing
People from Greene County, New York
Medalists at the 1932 Summer Olympics